Ärina is a village in Väike-Maarja Parish, Lääne-Viru County, in northeastern Estonia.

Ärina is the birthplace of Greco Roman wrestler Herman Kruusenberg (1898–1970).

References

 

Villages in Lääne-Viru County